Tadeusz Józef Madziarczyk (born 21 February 1961 in Prudnik) is a Polish politician. He was elected to the Sejm on 25 September 2005, getting 8,068 votes in 1 Legnica district as a candidate from the Law and Justice list.

See also
Members of Polish Sejm 2005-2007

External links
Tadeusz Madziarczyk - parliamentary page - includes declarations of interest, voting record, and transcripts of speeches.

1961 births
Living people
People from Prudnik
Members of the Polish Sejm 2005–2007
Law and Justice politicians